TheSchool of Nancy may refer to:

 Nancy School a school of hypnosis and psychotherapy
 École de Nancy a stream of Art Nouveau